Moycullen is a Gaeltacht village in County Galway, Ireland, about 10 km (7 mi) northwest of Galway city. It is near Lough Corrib, on the N59 road to Oughterard and Clifden, in Connemara.
Moycullen is now a satellite town of Galway with some residents commuting to the city for work, school, and business. Although Moycullen and its hinterland are classified as a ‘Gaeltacht’ area, the language has not been the local vernacular for many years. Moycullen falls under a Category C Gaeltacht Area due to its low percentage of daily Irish speakers.

Education
There is a primary school in the village, Scoil Mhuire, and three other primary schools in the parish: Scoil Naomh Bríde in Tullykyne, Scoil Bhaile Nua in Newtown, and Scoil Naomh Cholmáin in Tooreeny.

Catholic parish

There is a Catholic parish of the same name that is part of the Roman Catholic Diocese of Galway, Kilmacduagh and Kilfenora that is roughly co-extensive with the civil parish. 
The "Church of the Immaculate Conception" is located in the village.

Sport
It is home to two senior GAA clubs, a handball club and the Moycullen Basketball Club. Moycullen footballers won the Galway Senior Football Championship for the first time in 2020 and were victorious in the All-Ireland Intermediate Club Football Championship in 2008. The women's team won the Connacht intermediate Club Championship in 2017. Moycullen hurlers won the intermediate county championship in 1964 and 2011, the 2011 team going on to win the Connacht Intermediate Club Championship. In basketball, Moycullen won the President's Cup in 2009.

Railway
Moycullen railway station was opened by the Midland Great Western Railway on 1 January 1895, as part of its line from Galway to Clifden. The station, and the line, were closed by the Great Southern Railways on 29 April 1935.

People
 Mary O'Malley, poet
 Seán Kyne, politician

See also
 List of towns and villages in Ireland

References

External links

Moycullen Online
Moycullen Heritage
 Scoil Mhuire, the primary school in the village.
Cumann Peile Mhaigh Cuilinn
Moycullen Basketball Club

Towns and villages in County Galway
Gaeltacht places in County Galway